Cherleria is a genus of flowering plants in the family Caryophyllaceae, found in the Arctic and mountain areas of the northern hemisphere. Its center of diversity is the Balkans. It was enlarged in 2017 with species from other genera.

Species
Currently accepted species include:

Cherleria arctica (Steven ex Ser.) A.J.Moore & Dillenb.
Cherleria baldaccii (Halácsy) A.J.Moore & Dillenb.
Cherleria biflora (L.) A.J.Moore & Dillenb.
Cherleria capillacea (All.) A.J.Moore & Dillenb.
Cherleria circassica (Albov) A.J.Moore & Dillenb.
Cherleria dirphya (Trigas & Iatroú) A.J.Moore & Dillenb.
Cherleria doerfleri (Hayek) A.J.Moore & Dillenb.
Cherleria eglandulosa (Fenzl) Fedor.
Cherleria garckeana (Asch. & Sint. ex Boiss.) A.J.Moore & Dillenb.
Cherleria handelii (Mattf.) A.J.Moore & Dillenb.
Cherleria langii (G.Reuss) A.J.Moore & Dillenb.
Cherleria laricifolia (L.) Iamonico
Cherleria marcescens (Fernald) A.J.Moore & Dillenb.
Cherleria obtusiloba (Rydb.) A.J.Moore & Dillenb.
Cherleria parnonia (Kamari) A.J.Moore & Dillenb.
Cherleria rupestris (Labill.) A.J.Moore & Dillenb.
Cherleria sedoides L.
Cherleria wettsteinii (Mattf.) A.J.Moore & Dillenb.
Cherleria yukonensis (Hultén) A.J.Moore & Dillenb.

References

Caryophyllaceae
Caryophyllaceae genera